First National Bank (Arabic: فرست ناشونال بنك) is a Lebanese financial bank, established in the year 1991 under the name (Bank of Commerce SAL).

The bank continued to carry out limited banking activities until the year 1994, when a group of Gulf businessmen acquired the bank's shares, including Mr. Mohammed Al-Sager.

In the year 2000, Lebanon Invest SAL acquired 62% of the bank's shares, and in 2002 the aforementioned bank merged with the Societe Bancaire du Liban (SBL) and the name was changed to First National Bank.

The bank includes 24 branches in Lebanon.

Key people 

 Rami Nemer, chairman (2009)

See also 

 List of Banks in Lebanon
Byblos Bank
Audi Bank
Banque du Liban
Economy of Lebanon

References

External links 

 Official website

Banks established in 1991
Banks of Lebanon